The 2006 French Open was a tennis tournament that took place on the outdoor clay courts at the Stade Roland Garros in Paris, France from 28 May to 11 June 2006. It was the 110th staging of the French Open, and the second of the four Grand Slam tennis events of 2006. This edition made history as it became the first Grand Slam tournament to start on a Sunday. It was the 2nd time since 1985 that all top 4 seeds reached the semifinals in the men's singles of a Grand Slam tournament. This did not happen again until the same tournament five years later. Both defending champions, Rafael Nadal and Justine Henin-Hardenne, retained their titles.

Seniors

Men's singles

 Rafael Nadal defeated  Roger Federer, 1–6, 6–1, 6–4, 7–6(7–4)
It was Nadal's 2nd career Grand Slam title, and his 2nd (consecutive) French Open title.

Women's singles

 Justine Henin-Hardenne defeated  Svetlana Kuznetsova, 6–4, 6–4
It was Henin-Hardenne's 3rd title of the year, and her 26th overall. It was her 5th career Grand Slam title, and her 3rd French Open title.

Men's doubles

 Jonas Björkman /  Max Mirnyi defeated  Mike Bryan /  Bob Bryan, 6–7(5–7), 6–4, 7–5

Women's doubles

 Lisa Raymond /  Samantha Stosur defeated  Daniela Hantuchová /  Ai Sugiyama, 6–3, 6–2

Mixed doubles

 Katarina Srebotnik /  Nenad Zimonjić defeated  Elena Likhovtseva /  Daniel Nestor, 6–3, 6–4

Juniors

Boys' singles

 Martin Kližan defeated  Philip Bester 6–3, 6–1

Girls' singles

 Agnieszka Radwańska defeated  Anastasia Pavlyuchenkova 6–4, 6–1

Boys' doubles

 Emiliano Massa /  Kei Nishikori defeated  Artur Chernov /  Valery Rudnev 2–6, 6–1, 6–2

Girls' doubles

 Sharon Fichman /  Anastasia Pavlyuchenkova defeated  Agnieszka Radwańska /  Caroline Wozniacki 6–7(4–7), 6–2, 6–1

Seeds

Men's singles
 Roger Federer (Runner-up, lost to Rafael Nadal)
 Rafael Nadal (champion)
 David Nalbandian (semifinals, retired against Roger Federer)
 Ivan Ljubičić (semifinals, lost to Rafael Nadal)
 Andy Roddick (first round, retired against Alberto Martín)
 Nikolay Davydenko (quarterfinals, lost to David Nalbandian)
 Tommy Robredo (fourth round, lost to Mario Ančić)
 James Blake (third round, lost to Gaël Monfils)
 Fernando González (second round, lost to Novak Djokovic)
 Gastón Gaudio (fourth round, lost to Nikolay Davydenko)
 Radek Štěpánek (third round, lost to Julien Benneteau)
 Mario Ančić (quarterfinals, lost to Roger Federer)
 Nicolas Kiefer (third round, retired against Tomáš Berdych)
 Lleyton Hewitt (fourth round, lost to Rafael Nadal)
 David Ferrer (third round, lost to Rubén Ramírez Hidalgo)
 Jarkko Nieminen (first round, retired against Raemon Sluiter)
 Robby Ginepri (first round, lost to Albert Montañés)
 Thomas Johansson (first round, lost to Christophe Rochus)
 Marcos Baghdatis (second round, lost to Julien Benneteau)
 Tomáš Berdych (fourth round, lost to Roger Federer)
 Sébastien Grosjean (second round, lost to Martín Vassallo Argüello)
 Dominik Hrbatý (third round, lost to Lleyton Hewitt)
 Tommy Haas (third round, lost to Novak Djokovic)
 Juan Carlos Ferrero (third round, lost to Gastón Gaudio)
 Gaël Monfils (fourth round, lost to Novak Djokovic)
 José Acasuso (second round, lost to Lukáš Dlouhý)
 Olivier Rochus (third round, lost to Alberto Martín)
 Fernando Verdasco (second round, lost to Juan Mónaco)
 Paul-Henri Mathieu (third round, lost to Rafael Nadal)
 Carlos Moyá (third round, lost to Nikolay Davydenko)
 Dmitry Tursunov (third round, lost to David Nalbandian)
 Nicolas Massú (third round, lost to Roger Federer)

Women's singles
 Amélie Mauresmo (fourth round, lost to Nicole Vaidišová)
 Kim Clijsters (semifinals, lost to Justine Henin-Hardenne)
 Nadia Petrova (first round, lost to Akiko Morigami)
 Maria Sharapova (fourth round, lost to Dinara Safina)
 Justine Henin-Hardenne (champion)
 Elena Dementieva (third round, lost to Shahar Pe'er)
 Patty Schnyder (fourth round, lost to Venus Williams)
 Svetlana Kuznetsova (Runner-up, lost to Justine Henin-Hardenne)
 Francesca Schiavone (fourth round, lost to Svetlana Kuznetsova)
 Anastasia Myskina (fourth round, lost to Justine Henin-Hardenne)
 Venus Williams (quarterfinals, lost to Nicole Vaidišová)
 Martina Hingis (quarterfinals, lost to Kim Clijsters)
 Anna-Lena Grönefeld (quarterfinals, lost to Justine Henin-Hardenne)
 Dinara Safina (quarterfinals, lost to Svetlana Kuznetsova)
 Daniela Hantuchová (fourth round, lost to Kim Clijsters)
 Nicole Vaidišová (semifinals, lost to Svetlana Kuznetsova)
 Flavia Pennetta (third round, lost to Francesca Schiavone)
 Elena Likhovtseva (first round, lost to Karolina Šprem)
 Ana Ivanovic (third round, lost to Anastasia Myskina)
 Maria Kirilenko (third round, lost to Anna-Lena Grönefeld)
 Nathalie Dechy (third round, lost to Daniela Hantuchová)
 Ai Sugiyama (second round, lost to Aravane Rezaï)
 Tatiana Golovin (first round, lost to Zheng Jie)
 Katarina Srebotnik (third round, lost to Dinara Safina)
 Marion Bartoli (second round, lost to Jelena Janković)
 Anabel Medina Garrigues (third round, lost to Kim Clijsters)
 Anna Chakvetadze (second round, lost to Li Na)   
 Lucie Šafářová (first round, lost to Anda Perianu)
 Sofia Arvidsson (second round, lost to Julia Vakulenko)
 Klára Koukalová (first round, lost to Tathiana Garbin) 
 Shahar Pe'er (fourth round, lost to Martina Hingis)
 Gisela Dulko (fourth round, lost to Anna-Lena Grönefeld)

Wild card entries
Below are the lists of the wild cards awardees entering in the main draws.

Men's singles
  Thierry Ascione
  Jérémy Chardy
  Jean-Christophe Faurel
  Marc Gicquel
  Nathan Healey
  Michaël Llodra
  Mathieu Montcourt
  Olivier Patience

Women's singles
  Séverine Brémond
  Stéphanie Cohen-Aloro
  Alizé Cornet
  Youlia Fedossova
  Mathilde Johansson
  Alicia Molik
  Pauline Parmentier
  Aurélie Védy

Men's doubles
  Thierry Ascione /  Florent Serra
  Jean-François Bachelot /  Stéphane Robert
  Grégory Carraz /  Antony Dupuis
  Jérémy Chardy /  Josselin Ouanna
  Nicolas Devilder /  Olivier Patience
  Marc Gicquel /  Gilles Simon
  Jérôme Haehnel /  Alexandre Sidorenko

Women's doubles
  Séverine Brémond /  Sophie Lefèvre
  Diana Brunel /  Florence Haring
  Julie Coin /  Youlia Fedossova
  Alizé Cornet /  Virginie Pichet
  Caroline Dhenin /  Mathilde Johansson
  Mariana Díaz Oliva /  Alicia Molik
  Pauline Parmentier /  Camille Pin

Mixed doubles
  Séverine Brémond /  Marc Gicquel
  Alizé Cornet /  Jérémy Chardy
  Stéphanie Foretz /  Michaël Llodra
  Émilie Loit /  Julien Jeanpierre (withdrew)
  Pauline Parmentier /  Marcos Baghdatis
  Virginie Razzano /  Antony Dupuis

Qualifier entries

Men's qualifiers entries

  Wayne Arthurs
  Roko Karanušić
  Martín Vassallo Argüello
  Juan Martín del Potro
  Dick Norman
  Stefano Galvani
  Edgardo Massa
  Kristian Pless
  Evgeny Korolev
  Sergio Roitman
  Dieter Kindlmann
  Saša Tuksar
  Ilija Bozoljac
  Diego Hartfield
  Júlio Silva
  Óscar Hernández

The following players received entry into a lucky loser spot:
  Melle van Gemerden
  Kevin Kim
  Alejandro Falla

Women's qualifiers entries

  Julia Vakulenko
  Eva Birnerová
  Sandra Klösel
  Clarisa Fernández
  Victoria Azarenka
  Alberta Brianti
  Hsieh Su-wei
  Anda Perianu
  Virginie Pichet
  Galina Voskoboeva
  Aravane Rezaï
  Yuliya Beygelzimer

The following player received entry into a lucky loser spot:
  Kirsten Flipkens

Withdrawn players

Men's singles
  Andre Agassi → replaced by  Kenneth Carlsen
  Igor Andreev → replaced by  Albert Portas
  Agustín Calleri → replaced by  Kevin Kim
  Arnaud Clément → replaced by  Melle van Gemerden
  Guillermo Coria → replaced by  Fernando Vicente
  Taylor Dent → replaced by  Oliver Marach
  Victor Hănescu → replaced by  Alejandro Falla

Women's singles
  Elena Bovina → replaced by  Ivana Lisjak
  Lindsay Davenport → replaced by  Yuliana Fedak
  Nuria Llagostera Vives → replaced by  Nathalie Viérin
  Conchita Martínez → replaced by  Arantxa Parra Santonja
  Marie-Gaïané Mikaelian → replaced by  Anastasia Rodionova
  Mary Pierce → replaced by  Kirsten Flipkens
  Serena Williams → replaced by  Hana Šromová

External links

French Open official website

Notes

 
2006 in French tennis
2006 in Paris
May 2006 sports events in France
June 2006 sports events in France